Pseudonaclia puella is a moth in the subfamily Arctiinae. It was described by Jean Baptiste Boisduval in 1847. It is found in Kenya, Mozambique, South Africa, Zambia and Zimbabwe.

References

Moths described in 1847
Arctiinae
Moths of Sub-Saharan Africa